Leon Strickland (born 20 July 1982 in Jamaica) is a Jamaican professional football player who plays as a striker, he currently plays for Arnett Gardens in the top-flight Jamaica National Premier League.

Career
He was Arnett Gardens' top goalscorer in the 2006/2007 season. In January 2008 he joined Waterhouse F.C. but halfway next season he rejoined Arnett.

International career
Strickland made his debut for Jamaica in a November 2006 friendly match against Peru, coming on as a late substitute for Jamal Campbell-Ryce.

External links
 Profile at Golocaljamaica

References

1982 births
Living people
Jamaican footballers
Arnett Gardens F.C. players
Jamaica international footballers
Waterhouse F.C. players
Association football forwards
National Premier League players